A thermie (th) is a non-SI metric unit of heat energy, part of the metre-tonne-second system sometimes used by European engineers.

References 

Units of energy
Metre–tonne–second system of units
Non-SI metric units